Candice Hopkins (born 1977) is a Carcross/Tagish First Nation independent curator, writer, and researcher who predominantly explores areas of indigenous history, and art.

Early life and education 
Candice Hopkins was born 1977 in Whitehorse, Yukon, Canada. Hopkins is a citizen of Carcross/Tagish First Nation. Hopkins was raised in Fort St. John, British Columbia. She did an internship in Fiji through the Native Friendship Centre, working with local artists in recovering the indigenous knowledge of traditional medicine.

Hopkins attended school for her undergraduate degree in Calgary and attended the masters program in the Center for Curatorial Studies, Bard College.

Curation 
Hopkins is co-curator of the 2018 SITE Santa Fe biennial, Casa tomada and recently named senior curator for the 2019 Toronto Biennial of Art and on the curatorial team of the Canadian Pavilion of the 58th Venice Biennale, featuring the work of the media art collective Isuma. She was a curator for documenta 14. She has held curatorial positions at prestigious institutions including the Walter Phillips Gallery, Western Front Society, the National Gallery of Canada, and The Institute of American Indian Arts Museum of Contemporary Native Arts in Santa Fe, New Mexico. She has been published widely and lectured internationally and is the recipient of the 2015 Hnatyshyn Foundation Award for Curatorial Excellence in Contemporary Art.

Writing
Her recent essays include "The Appropriation Debates" for Mousse magazine, "Outlawed Social Life", on the ban of the potlatch ceremony and the work of the late artist Beau Dick for the documenta 14 edited issue of South as a State of Mind (2016) as well as the chapter "The Gilded Gaze: Wealth and Economies on the Colonial Frontier," in the documenta 14 Reader.

In 2016, as part of the run-up to 2017's Documenta 14 in Kassel, Germany, and Athens, Greece, Hopkins co-organized the School of Listening, a summer intensive program in Kassel for students from both cities. In September, 2016 Hopkins quickly responded to the untimely death of artist Annie Pootoogook in the article "An Elegy for Annie Pootoogook (1969–2016)", featured in the online art criticism publication Momus. For the conclusion of the article Hopkins draws similarities between Pootoogook's generous character and her unbridled genius and Sedna, an Arctic folkloric character who met an untimely death by drowning, and through death evolved to become the mother of the sea.

For the 13th edition of Fillip released in the Spring 2011, Hopkins authored a text titled "The Golden Potlatch: Study in Mimesis and Capitalist Desire". In this text Hopkins introduces the interconnectedness between Indigenous lands, prospectors interests and monetary desires catalyzed by the Klondike Gold Rush.

Other writings and articles include "Fair Trade Heads: A Conversation on Repatriation and Indigenous Peoples with Maria Thereza Alves and Jolene Rickard" for South As a State of Mind; "Inventory" for C Magazine on sound, harmonics and indigenous pedagogies; "Native North America," a conversation with Richard William Hill for Mousse Magazine, and, also in Mousse, an interview with artist and architect Joar Nango, "Temporary Structures and Architecture on the Move."

Curatorial projects 
A select list of curation projects by Hopkins.
 Before the Internet: Networks and Art (2007), Western Front, Vancouver, British Columbia, Canada
 Sakahàn: International Indigenous Art (2013), National Gallery of Canada, Ottawa, Ontario, Canada
 Close Encounters: The Next 500 Years (2011), Plug In Institute of Contemporary Art, Winnipeg, Manitoba, Canada
Unsettled Landscapes: SITELINES (2014). Hopkins worked as team with three other individuals, including Lucía Sanromán, Curator (b. Guadalajara, México; lives in Mexico City) Janet Dees, Curator of Special Projects (b. New York; lives in Santa Fe) Irene Hofmann, SITElines Director (b. New York; lives in Santa Fe).
dOCUMENTA 14, Kassel, Germany and Athens, Greece (2017)
2018 Sitelines Biennial (2018), SITE Santa Fe
58th Venice Biennial (2019), Canadian Pavilion
Soundings: An Exhibition in Five Parts (2020), curated by Candice Hopkins and Dylan Robinson, and featured newly commissioned scores, performances, videos, sculptures and sound by Indigenous and other artists who respond to this question. Organized by Agnes Etherington Art Centre, Queen's University, Canada. The traveling exhibition is organized by Independent Curators International (ICI).

Publications

Books

Articles

References 

1977 births
Living people
21st-century First Nations writers
Bard College alumni
Tlingit people
Writers from Whitehorse
Women art historians
Canadian women curators
First Nations women writers
Canadian art curators
21st-century Canadian women writers